Kenny George Michael Davis (born 17 April 1988) is an English professional footballer who plays as a midfielder for Aldershot Town on loan from Farnborough. He has played for Redbridge, Harlow Town, Grays Athletic, Braintree Town, Boreham Wood and Sutton United.

Career
Davis spent his early career with Redbridge, Harlow Town, Grays Athletic and Braintree Town. He was captain of Braintree Town. He signed for Boreham Wood in May 2016, and Sutton United in May 2017. Davis was released by Sutton following their first season in the Football League at the end of the 2021–22 season.

On 2 July 2022, following his release from Sutton, Davis joined newly-promoted National League South side, Farnborough. In October 2022, Davis joined Aldershot Town on a one-month loan deal.

Personal life
Upon Sutton's promotion to the Football League, Davis stated his commitment to retain his job as a black cab driver.

Career statistics

References

1988 births
Living people
English footballers
Redbridge F.C. players
Harlow Town F.C. players
Grays Athletic F.C. players
Braintree Town F.C. players
Boreham Wood F.C. players
Sutton United F.C. players
Farnborough F.C. players
Aldershot Town F.C. players
National League (English football) players
Southern Football League players
Isthmian League players
English Football League players
Association football midfielders
Footballers from the London Borough of Camden